Barnard Castle Urban District was the local government area for the urban district of Barnard Castle in County Durham created in 1894 and dissolved in 1974. The town also governed the Barnard Castle Rural District throughout the period.

References

Local government in County Durham
Barnard Castle